Waverley School could refer to any one of several schools:

United Kingdom
 Waverley School, Birmingham
 Waverley Abbey School, Surrey

Elsewhere
 Waverley College, New South Wales, Australia
 Waverley Elementary School, Vancouver, Canada
 Waverley Primary School, Taranaki, New Zealand
 Waverley Girls' High School, Waverley, Johannesburg, South Africa